Malir Town lies in the northern part of the city that was named after the Malir River.

History

Administrative status

2000 
The federal government under introduced local government reforms in the year 2000, which eliminated the previous "third tier of government" (administrative divisions) and replaced it with the fourth tier (districts). The effect in Karachi was the dissolution of the former Karachi Division, and the merging of its five districts to form a new Karachi City-District with eighteen autonomous constituent towns including Malir Town.

2001 
Malir District was abolished as part of The Local Government Ordinance 2001 and divided into three towns namely:

 Malir Town,
 Bin Qasim Town
 and Gadap Town.

Malir Town was formed and was subdivided into 8 union councils.

2011 
In 2011, the system was disbanded but remained in place for bureaucratic administration until 2015, when the Karachi Metropolitan Corporation system was reintroduced.

On 11 July 2011, Sindh Government restored Malir District again.

The town system was disbanded in 2011.

2015 
In 2015, Malir Town was re-organized as part of Karachi Malir District.

Location 
Malir Town was bordered by the Jinnah International Airport and the Malir Cantonment to the west and north, the Malir River and Shah Faisal Town to the south and Gadap Town to the east across the Thado Nallo stream.

Neighborhoods

See also 
 Malir Development Authority
 Malir (disambiguation)
 Malir River
 Malir District
 Malir Cantonment
 Malir Cantonment railway station

References

External links 
 Karachi website (Archived)
 Malir Town (Archived)

 
Malir District
Towns in Karachi

sv:Malir